Quoya may refer to:
 Quoya (gastropod) a genus of air-breathing sea slugs in the family Onchidiidae
 Quoya (plant), a genus of Australian plants in the family Lamiaceae